Icardi is a surname. Notable people with the surname include:

Andrea Icardi (born 1963), Italian footballer and manager
Mauro Icardi (born 1993), Argentine footballer
Simone Icardi (born 1996), Italian football player